Frame conservation is the preservation of picture frames. This involves replicating missing decorative elements, cleaning, gilding, and toning frame surfaces.

Gilding

Gilding, in the context of frame preservation, describes the process by which metal leaf is applied to a frame to restore areas of the preexisting leaf that have damage.

Toning

References

External links
 Videos of the frame conservation process from the Smithsonian Institution

Conservation and restoration of cultural heritage
Picture framing